The NFLPA Collegiate Bowl is a post-season college football all-star game for NFL draft-eligible college players, held annually in January. The event was founded in 2012 by the National Football League Players Association (NFLPA). Players predominantly, but not exclusively, are from teams within the Football Bowl Subdivision (FBS) and the Football Championship Subdivision (FCS).

The first six editions of the game were played in Carson, California, at the venue previously known as Home Depot Center and later as StubHub Center. Starting with the 2018 edition, the game has been held at the Rose Bowl in Pasadena, California.

History
In January 2012, the National Football League Players Association (NFLPA) founded the NFLPA Collegiate Bowl after sponsoring  the Texas vs The Nation game in previous years. The inaugural NFLPA Collegiate Bowl was open to NFL draft-eligible underclassmen players but, beginning with the second annual event, only draft-eligible seniors were allowed to participate.

The event was established in part to prepare draft-eligible college football players for a career in the NFL. During the week preceding the game, the NFLPA provides an introduction to the players union and educates players on the business side of an NFL career. Current and former NFL players are invited to attend the week's events to share their NFL experiences with the draft eligible players. The NFLPA also hosts community-focused events including a youth football clinic.

The 2012 and 2013 games were hosted at the Home Depot Center in Carson, California. The Home Depot Center was renamed the StubHub Center in June 2013; the venue subsequently hosted the 2014 through 2017 games. In November 2017, bowl organizers announced the game would relocate to the Rose Bowl stadium in Pasadena, California, effective with the 2018 game. The game was sponsored by AstroTurf in 2012, Winnol in 2013, and Panini America in 2014.

The game utilizes some special rules. As of the 2018 edition, a kickoff starts each half (per normal rules), while the second and fourth quarters begin with the team that kicked off the half starting with a first-and-ten at their 25-yard-line. Also, a team trailing by 20 or more points retains possession of the ball following a score.

According to the game's official website, 112 players participated in the 2018 game, representing 84 colleges; 42 players were invited to the 2018 NFL Scouting Combine, with 19 selected in the 2018 NFL Draft.

Game results

Through the 2023 playing of the game, the National team leads the series, 9–2. Coach and score of the winning team are in bold font.

Source:

MVPs

Source:

Broadcasting
In 2012, the inaugural NFLPA Collegiate Bowl was broadcast on the NBC Sports Network. In December 2012, the NFLPA and ESPN signed a multiyear agreement to air the game on the ESPN network. The 2013 game was broadcast on ESPN2 and, as part of the agreement, some of the practices leading up to the event were aired on ESPNU. ESPN continued as the broadcaster through the 2016 game. In 2017, the game moved to Fox Sports 1. In 2020, it moved to the NFL Network, the first game in an agreement to run through the 2024 edition.

See also 

List of college bowl games

References

External links
 
 

Recurring sporting events established in 2012
College football all-star games
Sports competitions in Carson, California
Sports competitions in Pasadena, California
American football in California